Kristian Dobrev (born 27 April 2001) is a Bulgarian footballer who currently plays as a forward for Slavia Sofia.

Career
Kristian started his career in the youth ranks of his hometown club Neftochimic Burgas, but moved to Botev Plovdiv's academy in May 2014.  On 26 November 2016, he made his professional debut in a 1–3 home defeat against Ludogorets Razgrad, coming on as substitute for Omar Kossoko.

Kris Dobrev scored his debut goal in an official game for Botev Plovdiv on 7 April 2017 during the 7-1 win over Montana. He became the youngest player to score a goal in Bulgarian First League, scoring at the age of 15 years and 345 days.

On 25 February 2019 Dobrev scored a goal during the 4-0 win over FC Vereya. He won the award for goal of the round. In August 2021, he joined Slavia Sofia.

Career statistics

Club

Honours

Club
Botev Plovdiv
Bulgarian Supercup: 2017

Individual
 Bulgarian First League debut of the year (1): 2016* 
(*Jointly shared with Eyad Hammoud)

References

External links

Living people
2001 births
Bulgarian footballers
Association football forwards
Botev Plovdiv players
FC Porto B players
First Professional Football League (Bulgaria) players